Virginia Davis (December 31, 1918 – August 15, 2009) was an American child actress in films. She is best known for working with Walt Disney and Ub Iwerks on the animated short series Alice Comedies, in which she portrayed the protagonist Alice.

Biography
Davis was born on December 31, 1918, in Kansas City, Missouri. Her father, a furniture salesman, was often away on business.

Alice Comedies
Davis began working for Walt Disney's Kansas City company, Laugh-O-Gram Studio, in 1923. She was hired to act in a film called Alice's Wonderland, which combined live action with animation. When Laugh-O-Gram failed and Disney moved to Los Angeles, on the basis of Alice's Wonderland Winkler Pictures signed Disney for a series known as the Alice Comedies, or Alice in Cartoonland. Disney convinced Davis' family to bring her from Missouri to Los Angeles to star in the series. During this time, Davis resided at the La Brea Apartments in Hollywood, California.

The Greater Glory
In 1925, Davis played the role of Resi in The Greater Glory, a First National Pictures production. The film's director, Curt Rehfeld, remarked that Davis "... has the technique of a finished artist, the unusual ability to follow direction and the disposition of an angel. Not once during the picture was it necessary for me to explain any angle twice and, with all of her mature understanding, the youthful charm still remains, making a rare and appreciated combination."

While filming The Greater Glory, Davis signed a contract with Harry Carey and the two actors worked together in The Man From Red Gulch (1925).

The Blue Bird
In December 1929, Davis was in the cast of The Blue Bird at the Pasadena Playhouse. The fairy play included Janet Horning, a child actress who was only two years old. The cast included 150 children.

Retirement
Recalling her work on the Alice Comedies, Davis said, "It was a great time – full of fun, adventure, and 'let's pretend.' I adored and idolized Walt, as any child would. He would direct me in a large manner with great sweeping gestures. One of my favorite pictures was Alice's Wild West Show. I was always the kid with the curls, but I was really a tomboy, and that picture allowed me to act tough. I took great joy in that."

Over the next 20 years, she went on to work at other Hollywood studios as a child actress and, later, as a supporting actress. She sang, danced, and acted in such films as Flying Down to Rio (1933), Young and Beautiful (1934), College Holiday (1936), Vivacious Lady (1938), Three on a Match (1932), Week-End in Havana (1941), Song of the Islands (1942) and The Harvey Girls (1946) among others. On several occasions, she used the screen name Mary Daily, and appeared in such films as Hands Across the Rockies (1941) with cowboy star Bill Elliott. During her Hollywood tenure, she also occasionally worked for her old boss, Walt Disney, did a vocal test for Snow White, voiced some supporting characters in Pinocchio and served a short stint in the Disney Studio's Ink-and-Paint department.

Personal life
In 1943, she married Navy aviator Robert McGhee, and the couple had two daughters. During their 59-year marriage, they resided in New Jersey, Connecticut, Southern California, and Idaho. Over a 25-year period, Davis worked as a real estate agent mostly in the Irvine, California and Boise, Idaho areas.

Death
After a year of failing health, Davis-McGhee died of natural causes in her home in Corona, California on August 15, 2009, aged 90.

Awards
In 1998, Davis received a Disney Legends award for Animation.

Partial filmography

References

Further reading
 Los Angeles Times, "New Members of Players' Club", April 20, 1924, p. J3
 Los Angeles Times, "Older Sisters' Art Emulated", August 23, 1925, p. 20
 Los Angeles Times, "Tiny Actress in Blue Bird", December 29, 1929, p. 20
 Los Angeles Times, "Around And About in Hollywood", March 24, 1934, p. 7

External links
 

1918 births
2009 deaths
Actresses from Kansas City, Missouri
American female dancers
American dancers
American child actresses
American silent film actresses
American voice actresses
Burials at Holy Cross Cemetery, Culver City
Vaudeville performers
People from Corona, California
20th-century American actresses
Disney people
Disney Legends